The 2002 Michigan State Spartans football team represented Michigan State University in the 2002 NCAA Division I-A football season.  The Spartans played their home games at Spartan Stadium in East Lansing, Michigan. This was the third and final season for head coach Bobby Williams, who was replaced after the Michigan game by interim head coach Morris Watts.

The Spartans were coming off a 7–5 season which ended with a victory in the 2001 Silicon Valley Football Classic over the Fresno State Bulldogs. However, the 2002 season turned out to be very different. The Spartans finished 4–8, their worst record since 1994, and second losing season out of the previous three. Michigan State also finished 2–6 in the Big Ten, their 3rd straight losing season in Big Ten play.

Schedule

Roster

Rankings

Draft picks

References

Michigan State
Michigan State Spartans football seasons
Michigan State Spartans football